The Cactus Bowl (formerly the Snow Bowl) was a postseason college football all-star game played each January in Kingsville, Texas, which showcased the best NFL draft prospects of those collegiate players who had completed their eligibility in NCAA Division II. First played in 1994 at the Fargodome in Fargo, North Dakota, as the Snow Bowl, the game moved to Javelina Stadium on the campus of Texas A&M University–Kingsville in 2001 as the Cactus Bowl. Proceeds went to the Shriners Hospitals for Children.

The game typically consisted of 88 total players; in all but the final year, teams were designated East and West, composed of players from those regions of the United States. The game gave NFL scouts a chance to view the relatively low profile Division II talent, prompting its slogan of "the best players you've never seen."  The bowl's website (now defunct) said that more than 100 players of the game later signed with the NFL. The bowl lasted through 2011, after which it was merged with the USA College Football Bowl of NCAA Division III.

Winner

Overall records: West over East (10–5–1) and Red Storm over Blue Devils (1–0)

Most Valuable Players

Players in the NFL
Cactus Bowl players (2001–2010) who later appeared in the NFL.

See also
 List of college bowl games

References

External links
cactusbowl.org from February 2010 – via Wayback Machine

Defunct college football bowls
Recurring sporting events established in 1994
NCAA Division II football
College football in North Dakota
College football bowls in Texas
Texas A&M–Kingsville Javelinas